The Shinagawa City Basketball Club is a professional basketball team that competes in the Japanese B.League.

Roster

Notable players

Morgan Hikaru Aiken
Yuji Funayama (basketball)
Zane Knowles
Andre Murray [tl], League's steal leader in 2016
El Hadji Ndieguene
Samuel Jr. Sawaji
Anthony Stover
Hirohisa Takada
Shoya Uchimura
Marvin Williams
Ricky Woods
Dan Sperrazza

Coaches
Motofumi Aoki
Kenichi Kawachi
Kazuo Kusumoto
Lars Ekström
Joe Navarro (basketball)
Osamu Okada (es)
Yasuhito Matsui

Arenas
Inagi City General Gymnasium
Ota City General Gymnasium
Katayanagi Arena
Musashino Forest Sports Plaza
Chuo Ward General Sports Center
Musashino Sports Complex
Machida City General Gymnasium
Higashimurayama Citizens Sports Center
Samukawa General Gymnasium

References

 
Basketball teams established in 2012
Basketball teams in Japan
2012 establishments in Japan